Formula One Grand Prix, F1 Grand Prix or F1GP may refer to:

 Formula One Grand Prix – for example:
 Formula One racing, for information about the Grand Prix event
 List of Formula One Grands Prix, for a list of  that have been held as part of the Formula One World Championship
 F-1 Grand Prix (video game series), a video game series created by Video System that started in 1991
 Formula One Grand Prix (video game), a video game released in 1992
 F1 Grand Prix (2005 video game), a video game released in 2005

See also
 Grand Prix (disambiguation)
 Formula One (disambiguation)
 F1 (disambiguation)
 GP (disambiguation)